Tiruchuli is a village in the Indian state of Tamil Nadu. It is sited about 15 kilometres east of Aruppukkottai, 40 km east of Virudhunagar, and 45 km south of Madurai. The village is the birthplace of Sri Ramana Maharishi, the most revered 20th century Hindu saint.

Temples
Saivite and Thirumeninathar temple are located in Tiruchuli. Thirumeninathar is one of the oldest in South India. The god in this temple was worshiped by the 63 popular Saivites in Tamil Nadu. Tiruchuli is located on the western bank of the Gundar River. 

The Bhuminathaswamy temple at Tiruchuli is counted among the 14 famous Shiva centers in Pandya Nadu. Its god is Bhuminathar and its goddess is Thunaimalai Amman. Its deities have been venerated in the hymns sung by Shaivite Nayanar Sundaramoorthy and Sekkilar.

The temple has undergone extensive renovations and the present building accommodates shrines built over time within the high boundary walls constructed during the reign of Muthuramalinga Setupati. Swami Vivekananda stayed three days in this temple due to the floods in the Gundar River during his yatras.

Tiruchuli is admired by people who are pious, religious, and love seclusion for meditation and chants in the name of the divine. A famous shrine is in the Agraharam adjoining the temple, called Sundara Mandiram, which is the house where Bhagavan Sri Ramana Maharshi was born.

A temple for the Tamil philosopher-saint Valluvar, the author of the Tirukkural, is located in Periya Pudupatti village near Tiruchuli. People consider Valluvar as the 64th Nayanmar of the Saivite tradition and worship him as god and saint, taking annual procession.

Economy 
The main occupation is agriculture. Most of the government staff and school teachers who work in Tiruchuli and other surrounding villages live there.

Tiruchuli has its own railway station, taluk office, police station, post office, treasury, government hospital, State Bank of India and higher secondary schools.

Demographics 
In 2011 the town had a population of 7,688.

Geography 
The River Gundar flows on the east side of the village. A large lake is situated on the west side. 

The groundwater level in Tiruchuli is a persistent issue despite 15 years of work to address it. A large Kanmai sits on about 550 acres in Tiruchuli. 5 cults are present in this Kanmai. During the rainy season, flooding is possible and Panthanenthal Kanmai becomes filled with water through the canal. Then the surplus water flows through the canal of the Tiruchuli Kanmai. This is because the canals have not been maintained. Thus, the big Kanmai did not leave the water.

The 1,500 acres of the three villages of Tiruchuli, Pachcheri and Tamil Padi became marshland. To overcome this problem, Tamil Nadu and Tiruchuli residents did maintenance and reconstruction with their own efforts. In 2017, in the areas of Theni, Usilampatti and Tirumangalam, flooding in the Kunda, filled Kanmai with floodwater that led to a rise in groundwater levels. In addition, the water level in the wells also rose. Thus, work on agricultural lands continues.

Schools
 T.U.N.S.V. Higher Secondary School
 Hindu Satriya Vidyalaya Primary school
 Sedupathy Higher Secondary School
 Muthu Primary School

Governance 
This place is part of the virudunagar district; the taluk falls under Ramnad M.P.

Tiruchuli (State Assembly Constituency) has been recently created. The present MLA of the constituency is Thangam Thennarasu and the union chairman for the local body is Ponnusamy.

An NGO, ODAM, operates outside of Tiruchuli and work on empowering women, educational classes and has established a research centre for biodiesel 7 km outside of the town.

Politics

References 

Villages in Virudhunagar district